Charles A. Huttar is an emeritus professor of English at Hope College, known for his work on the Inklings including J. R. R. Tolkien, C. S. Lewis, Owen Barfield, and Charles Williams. He has twice won the Mythopoeic Society's Scholarship Award.

Biography

Charles Adolph Huttar was born in 1932. He was educated at Wheaton College, and gained his PhD at Northwestern University in 1956. He became a professor of English literature at Hope College in 1966, retiring from there in 1996.

He is a longtime member of the Conference on Christianity and Literature and the Guild of Scholars of the Episcopal Church. He has written numerous papers on the Oxford literary group the Inklings, including on the authors J. R. R. Tolkien, C. S. Lewis, Owen Barfield, and Charles Williams. In addition, he studied medieval and early modern literature.

Awards and distinctions

 1992 Mythopoeic Society's Scholarship Award
 1997 Mythopoeic Society's Scholarship Award

Books

 1971 Imagination and the Spirit: Essays in Literature and the Christian Faith Presented to Clyde S. Kilby
 1991 Word and Story in C. S. Lewis (co-edited)
 1996 The Rhetoric of Vision: Essays on Charles Williams (co-edited)
 2005 Scandalous Truths: Essays by and about Susan Howatch

References 

1932 births
Tolkien studies
Northwestern University alumni
Wheaton College (Illinois) alumni
Hope College faculty
Living people